The 1934–35 season was the 36th season in the history of Berner Sport Club Young Boys. The team played their home games at Stadion Wankdorf in Bern, placing 12th in the Nationalliga, and being eliminated in the 3rd round of the Swiss Cup.

Players 
 Riesen
 Achille Siegrist
 Voléry
 Fritz Lehmann
 John Hürbin
 Hans Liniger
 Charlie Handley
 Albert Guerne
 Hediger
 Thomann
 Paul Schmid

Competitions

Overall record

Nationalliga

League table

Matches

Swiss Cup

Statistics

Goalscorers 
 Paul Schmid 7
 Josef Artimovics 6
 Kastl 5
 Walter Rufer 3
  Charles Harold James Handley 2
 Hermann Springer 2
 Ferdinand Samek 2
 Max Horisberger 2
 Achille Siegrist 1
 Fritz Lehmann 1
 Ernst Schreyer 1
 Own goal 2

References

BSC Young Boys seasons
Swiss football clubs 1934–35 season